Simonszand is a sandbank between the West Frisian Islands of Schiermonnikoog and Rottumerplaat in the Netherlands. It is located in the municipality of Het Hogeland in the province of Groningen.

The sandbank was originally mapped as being an Intertidal zone in approximately 1811, but changed in later mappings to be shown as a Supratidal zone after it became larger and migrated seaward.

References

External links 
 

Het Hogeland
Islands of Groningen (province)
Sandbanks of the North Sea
Uninhabited islands of the Netherlands
West Frisian Islands
Shoals of the Netherlands